Elwren is an unincorporated community in Van Buren Township, Monroe County, in the U.S. state of Indiana.

History
Founded in 1906, Elwren had its start when the railroad was extended to that point. The name is a portmanteau of the names of founding families Eller, Whaley, Baker, and Breedon. A post office was established at Elwren in 1910, and remained in operation until it was discontinued in 1934.

Geography

References

Unincorporated communities in Monroe County, Indiana
Unincorporated communities in Indiana
Bloomington metropolitan area, Indiana